The 1988 America East men's basketball tournament was hosted by the Hartford Hawks at the Hartford Civic Center. Only the top eight schools made it to the 1988 tournament, therefore excluding both Colgate and Vermont. Boston University gained its second overall America East Conference Championship and an automatic berth to the NCAA tournament with its win over Niagara University. Boston University was given the 15th seed in the East Regional of the NCAA Tournament and lost in the first round to Duke 85–69. Siena College gained a bid to the NIT and lost in the first round to Boston College 73–65.

Bracket and results

See also
America East Conference

References

America East Conference men's basketball tournament
1987–88 ECAC North men's basketball season